Alfred Vallette (1858, Paris – 1935) was a French man of letters.

He founded (in 1890) and edited the Mercure de France, a Symbolist review publication. His wife, Rachilde, helped him to edit it.

Publications 
À l'écart, avec Raoul Minhar, Paris, Perrin, 1891 ; réédition chez Honoré Champion, 2004.
La Vie grise. Le Vierge, Paris, Tresse et Stock, 1891 — Read online.
Le Roman d'un homme sérieux : Alfred Vallette à Rachilde, 1885-1889, Mercure de France, Paris, 1943. Réédition (preface Édith Silve), Mercure de France, 1994.
Lettres à A.-Ferdinand Herold, 1891-1935, et quelques-unes à son épouse, avant-propos et notes par Claire Lesage, Philippe Oriol, Christian Soulignac, Paris, Éditions du Fourneau, 1992.
 In perpetuum, roman inédit, Paris, Éditions du Fourneau, 1992.

External links

1858 births
1935 deaths
Writers from Paris
Symbolist writers
French male writers